Series Molles is a series within the genus Crataegus that contains at least six species of hawthorn trees and shrubs, native to Eastern North America. Some of the species are cultivated as ornamental plants. They have relatively large leaves, large flowers, and bloom early for hawthorns. The plant parts are usually hairy, particularly in early growth, and the fruit are generally red (sometimes yellow) and are large for hawthorn fruit (up to 2.5 cm diameter in some species).

Species
The principal species in the series are:
 Crataegus brazoria
 Crataegus lanuginosa
 Crataegus mollis
 Crataegus submollis
 Crataegus pennsylvanica
 Crataegus texana
The following rare local species appear to be hybrid derivatives of series Molles:
 Crataegus × kelloggii
 Crataegus × latebrosa
 Crataegus × dispessa

References

Molles
Flora of North America
Plant series